Meltdown is the third studio album by the American guitarist Vinnie Moore, released in 1991 through Relativity Records. Moore wanted to use a singer on the album but could not find a suitable one. He supported the album with a North American tour.

Critical reception

The Washington Post wrote that "this is fast and furious, finger-flying stuff for the most part, a power trio album devoted to torrid instrumental flights and designed to compete with the likes of Steve Vai." The Chicago Tribune concluded that "Moore's production is intense—much better than that of labelmate Steve Vai—with crisp snares, wicked-yet-smooth guitar squeals and steady low end."

Track listing

Personnel
Vinnie Moore – guitar, production
Joe Franco – drums
Greg Smith – bass
Paul Orofino – engineering
Bob Ludwig – mastering

References

Vinnie Moore albums
1991 albums
Relativity Records albums